This article contains a list of parliamentary groups in Italy.

Parliamentary groups representing a political party
Parliamentary groups since 1946.

Active parliamentary groups

Notes

Defunct parliamentary groups

Notes

Parliamentary groups not representing a political party

Active parliamentary groups

Mixed Group (Constituent Assembly / Chamber and Senate, 1946–present)
For the Autonomies (Senate, 2001–present)
Action – Italy Alive (Chamber and Senate, 2022–present)
Greens and Left Alliance (Chamber, 2022–present)
Us Moderates (Chamber, 2022–present)
Civics of Italy–Us Moderates (Senate, 2022–present)

Defunct parliamentary groups

Historical Right (Chamber, 1849–1913)
Historical Left (Chamber, 1849–1913)
Historical Far Left (Chamber, 1867–1904)
Dissident Left (Chamber, 1877–1887)
Autonomist Group (Constituent Assembly, 1946–1948)
National Democratic Union (Constituent Assembly, 1946–1948)
National Bloc of Freedom (Constituent Assembly, 1947–1948)
National Union (Constituent Assembly, 1947–1948)
Left Democratic Group (Senate, 1948–1953)
Democratic Group – Independents of the Left (Senate, 1953–1958)
Free–Social–Republican Group (Senate, 1953–1958)
Italian Social Movement–PNM/PDI (1958–1963)
Unified Socialist Party (Chamber and Senate, 1966–1969)
Independent Left (Senate, 1968–1992; Chamber, 1983–1992)
Italian Liberal Party–Italian Democratic Socialist Party (Senate, 1976–1979)
European Federalist Group (Chamber, 1987–1994)
Ecologist European Federalist Group (Senate, 1987–1992)
Proletarian Democracy–Communists (Chamber, 1991–1992)
Greens–The Network (Senate, 1992–1996)
Progressives (Chamber and Senate, 1994–1996)
Democratic Left (Senate, 1994–1996)
The Democrats (Chamber, 1995)
The Olive Tree (Chamber and Senate, 2006–2007)
Socialists and Radicals – Rose in the Fist (Chamber, 2006–2008)
Greens–Italian Communists (Senate, 2006–2008)
Christian Democracy for the Autonomies–New Italian Socialist Party (Chamber, 2006–2008)
Christian Democracy for the Autonomies–Movement for Autonomy (Senate, 2006–2008)
People and Territory (Chamber, 2011–2013)
National Cohesion (Senate, 2011–2013)
For the Third Pole (Senate, 2011–2013)
For Italy (Chamber, 2013–2014; Senate 2013–2014)
For Italy–Democratic Centre (Chamber, 2014–2016)
For Italy–Solidary Democracy (Chamber, 2016–2018)
Great Autonomies and Freedom (Senate, 2013–2018)
Popular Area (Senate, 2014–2017)
Civics and Innovators (Chamber, 2016–2018)
Federation of Freedom (Senate, 2017–2018)
Free and Equal (Chamber, 2018–2022)
Europeanists–MAIE–CD (Senate, 2021)
Constitution, Environment, Labour–PC–IdV (Senate, 2022)

See also
List of political parties in Italy
List of political coalitions in Italy

References 

Italy